Awaiting (lit. "The Day Min-woo Arrives") is a 2014 South Korean short film written and directed by Kang Je-gyu, starring Moon Chae-won and Go Soo.

It is one of four short films comprising Beautiful 2014, the third annual omnibus project commissioned by Chinese online platform Youku Tudou and the Hong Kong International Film Festival. The other short films were The Dream directed by Shu Kei, HK 2014 - Education for All directed by Christopher Doyle, and Boss I Love You directed by Zhang Yuan. Beautiful 2014 premiered at the 38th Hong Kong International Film Festival on March 27, 2014. Awaiting received a theatrical release in South Korea on December 18, 2014.

Plot
A young woman named Yeon-hee is traveling to Pyongyang with a coach full of elderly people. As she flips through old photographs, she remembers telling her husband Min-woo that she wouldn't allow him to "cross over" to North Korea given the political situation of the day. But Min-woo left anyway and never returned home, and their marriage was torn apart by the Korean War. Now, sixty years after the division of Korea, she looks forward to reuniting with her beloved Min-woo again.

Cast
Moon Chae-won as Yeon-hee (past)
Go Soo as Min-woo
Son Sook as Yeon-hee (present)
Yoo Ho-jeong as Sa-ra
Choi Kyu-hwan
Yoon Da-hoon as truck driver
Kim Su-ro
Lee Dong-jin as officer

References

External links

2014 films
2010s Korean-language films
South Korean short films
South Korean drama films
2014 drama films
2014 short films
Films directed by Kang Je-gyu
2010s South Korean films